Haughton is a civil parish in the Borough of Stafford, Staffordshire, England.  It contains eleven listed buildings that are recorded in the National Heritage List for England. Of these, two are at Grade II*, the middle of the three grades, and the others are at Grade II, the lowest grade.  The parish contains the village of Haughton and the surrounding countryside.  The listed buildings consist of a church, headstones in the churchyard, houses, cottages and farmhouses, the earliest of which are timber framed, and a war memorial.


Key

Buildings

References

Citations

Sources

Lists of listed buildings in Staffordshire